is an interchange passenger railway station located in Kawasaki-ku, Kawasaki, Kanagawa Prefecture, Japan, jointly operated by East Japan Railway Company (JR East) and the private railway operator Keikyū.

Lines
The station is served by the Keikyū Main Line and JR East's Nambu Branch Line. It is located 1.1 kilometers from the Shitte junction on the Nambu Branch Line, and 13.1 kilometers from the starting point of the Keikyū Main Line at Shinagawa Station, in Tokyo.

Station layout
The Keikyū station has two opposed side platforms connected to the station building by a footbridge, and the JR East station has one side platform serving a single track.

Platforms

History
Hatchōnawate Station opened on December 25, 1916, as a station on the Keihin Electric Railway. The Nambu Line connected to the station on March 25, 1930 initially for freight operations, and with passenger operations from April 10 of the same year. The Nambu line was nationalized on April 1, 1944 and freight operations abolished the same year. It later became part of the Japanese National Railways (JNR) system. The level crossing at the station was replaced by a footbridge on October 28, 1974. Along with privatization and division of JNR, JR East assumed operations of the Nambu Branch Line from April 1, 1987. The station building was rebuilt in 1989.

Keikyū introduced station numbering to its stations on 21 October 2010; Hatchōnawate Station was assigned station number KK27.

Passenger statistics
In fiscal 2019, the JR station was used by an average of 1,792 passengers daily (boarding passengers only). During the same period, the Keikyū Station  was used by an average of 16,165 passengers daily (total passengers).

The passenger figures (boarding passengers only) for previous years are as shown below.

Surrounding area
 Japan National Route 15
 Kawasaki Kyomachi Post Office
 Mashima Hospital

See also
 List of railway stations in Japan

References

External links

Keikyu Hatchōnawate Station 
JR East station information 

Railway stations in Kanagawa Prefecture
Railway stations in Kawasaki, Kanagawa
Railway stations in Japan opened in 1916